The 1993 Champion Hurdle was a horse race held at Cheltenham Racecourse on Tuesday 16 March 1993. It was the 64th running of the Champion Hurdle.

The winner was Eric Scarth's Granville Again, a seven-year-old chestnut gelding trained in Devon by Martin Pipe and ridden by Peter Scudamore. Granville Again's victory was a first in the race for trainer and owner and a second for Scudamore, who had ridden Celtic Shot to victory in 1988. Granville Again was a full brother to Morley Street, who had won the race in 1991.

Granville Again was a non-Thoroughbred gelding, who had been strongly fancied for the 1992 running of the race, but fell at the second last hurdle. Starting at odds of 13/2 he won the Champion Hurdle by a length from the 50/1 outsider Royal Derbi with Halkopous in third place. Two previous winners of the race, Morley Street and Kribensis took part and finished eleventh and twelfth respectively. Seventeen of the eighteen runners completed the course.

Race details
 Sponsor: Smurfit
 Purse: £141,590; First prize: £84,734
 Going: Good to Firm
 Distance: 2 miles 110 yards
 Number of runners: 18
 Winner's time: 3m 51.40

Full result

 Abbreviations: nse = nose; nk = neck; hd = head; dist = distance; UR = unseated rider; PU = pulled up; LFT = left at start; SU = slipped up; BD = brought down

Winner's details
Further details of the winner, Granville Again
 Sex: Gelding
 Foaled: 20 June 1986
 Country: United Kingdom
 Sire: Deep Run; Dam: High Board (High Line)
 Owner: Eric Scarth
 Breeder: M. Parkhill

References

Champion Hurdle
1993
Champion Hurdle
Champion Hurdle
1990s in Gloucestershire